Avdeyevo is a rural locality (a village) in Novlenskoye Rural Settlement of Vologodsky District, Vologda Oblast, Russia. The population was 2 as of 2010.

Geography 
Avdeyevo is located 66 km northwest of Vologda (the district's administrative centre) by road. Kelebardovo is the nearest rural locality.

References 

Rural localities in Vologodsky District